Essential is a 1991 collection of hits by Australian rock band Divinyls. The album was released by Divinyls previous record label, and includes tracks from their first three studio albums.

Track listing
 "Pleasure and Pain"
 "Temperamental" 
 "Back to the Wall"
 "Only Lonely"
 "Punxsie"
 "Don't You Go Walking"
 "Boys in Town"
 "Hey Little Boy"
 "Science Fiction"
 "Sleeping Beauty"
 "Casual Encounter"
 "I'll Make You Happy"

Charts

Certifications

References

1991 compilation albums
Divinyls compilation albums
EMI Records compilation albums